Sicyopterus is a genus of gobies native fresh waters from Madagascar to the Pacific islands.

Species
There are currently 37 recognized species in this genus:
 Sicyopterus aiensis Keith, Watson & Marquet, 2004 (Creek Ai's goby)
 Sicyopterus brevis de Beaufort, 1912
 Sicyopterus calliochromus Keith, G. R. Allen & Lord, 2012
 Sicyopterus caudimaculatus Maugé, Marquet & Laboute, 1992
 Sicyopterus crassus Herre, 1927
 Sicyopterus cynocephalus (Valenciennes, 1837) (Cleft-lipped goby)
 Sicyopterus erythropterus Keith, G. R. Allen & Lord, 2012
 Sicyopterus eudentatus Parenti & Maciolek, 1993
 Sicyopterus fasciatus (F. Day, 1874)
 Sicyopterus franouxi (Pellegrin, 1935)
 Sicyopterus fuliag Herre, 1927
 Sicyopterus griseus (F. Day, 1877)
 Sicyopterus hageni Popta, 1921 (Hagen's goby)
 Sicyopterus japonicus (S. Tanaka (I), 1909)
 Sicyopterus lacrymosus Herre, 1927
 Sicyopterus lagocephalus (Pallas, 1770) (Red-tailed goby)=Sicyopterus caeruleus (Lacépède, 1800)=Sicyopterus laticeps (Valenciennes, 1837)
 Sicyopterus lengguru Keith, Lord & Hadiaty, 2012
 Sicyopterus lividus Parenti & Maciolek, 1993
 Sicyopterus longifilis de Beaufort, 1912 (Thread-fin goby)
 Sicyopterus macrostetholepis (Bleeker, 1853)
 Sicyopterus marquesensis Fowler, 1932
 Sicyopterus microcephalus (Bleeker, 1855)
 Sicyopterus micrurus (Bleeker, 1853) (Clinging goby)
 Sicyopterus ocellaris Keith, G. R. Allen & Lord, 2012
 Sicyopterus ouwensi M. C. W. Weber, 1913 (Ouwen's goby)
 Sicyopterus panayensis Herre, 1927
 Sicyopterus parvei (Bleeker, 1853)
 Sicyopterus pugnans (Ogilvie-Grant, 1884)
 Sicyopterus punctissimus Sparks & D. W. Nelson, 2004
 Sicyopterus rapa Parenti & Maciolek, 1996
 Sicyopterus sarasini M. C. W. Weber & de Beaufort, 1915
 Sicyopterus squamosissimus Keith, Lord, Busson, Sauri, Hubert & Hadiaty, 2015 
 Sicyopterus stimpsoni (T. N. Gill, 1860) (Stimpson's goby)
 Sicyopterus stiphodonoides Keith, G. R. Allen & Lord, 2012
 Sicyopterus wichmanni (M. C. W. Weber, 1894)

References

 
Sicydiinae
Taxonomy articles created by Polbot